Anne-Sophie Mutter (born 29 June 1963) is a German violinist. Born and raised in Rheinfelden, Baden-Württemberg, Mutter started playing the violin at age five and continued studies in Germany and Switzerland. She was supported early in her career by Herbert von Karajan and made her orchestral debut with the Berlin Philharmonic in 1977. Since Mutter gained prominence in the 1970s and 1980s, she has recorded over 50 albums and performed as a soloist with leading orchestras worldwide and as a recitalist. Her primary instrument is the Lord Dunn–Raven Stradivarius violin. 

Mutter's repertoire includes traditional classical violin works from the Baroque period to the 20th century, but she also is known for performing, recording, and commissioning new works by present-day composers. As an advocate of contemporary music, she has had several works composed especially for her, by Thomas Adès, Unsuk Chin, Sebastian Currier, Henri Dutilleux, Sofia Gubaidulina, Witold Lutosławski, Norbert Moret, Krzysztof Penderecki, André Previn, Wolfgang Rihm, Jörg Widmann, and John Williams. 

Mutter has received numerous awards and prizes, including four Grammy Awards (1994, 1999, 2000, and 2005), Echo Klassik awards (2009, 2014), the Grand Decoration of Honour of Austria (2007), the Grand Cross Order of Merit of the Federal Republic of Germany (2009), France's Legion of Honour (2009), Spain's Gold Medal of Merit in the Fine Arts (2016), Romania's Grand Cross National Order of Merit (2017), Poland's Gold Medal for Merit to Culture – Gloria Artis (2018), Japan's Praemium Imperiale (2019), the Polar Music Prize (2019), and holds honorary memberships at the Royal Academy of Music (1986) and American Academy of Arts and Sciences (2013). 

Mutter founded the Association of Friends of the Anne-Sophie Mutter Foundation e.V. in 1997 and the Anne-Sophie Mutter Foundation in 2008, which support young string musicians. She frequently gives benefits concerts and, since 2021, has been the president of the German Cancer Aid.

Early life 
Her parents were Karl Wilhelm Mutter and Gerlinde Mutter and she was raised with two older brothers. While Mutter's father was a journalist, who edited a newspaper in Baden-Württemberg, her mother was the first woman in her family to graduate from college. Although no one in her family played a musical instrument, Mutter's family was passionate about classical music.

Mutter began playing the piano at the age of five, and shortly afterwards took up the violin. At the age of six, Mutter won the National Music Prize, and in 1972, she gave her first concert with the Winterthurer Stadtorchester. Inspired by a recording of violinist Yehudi Menuhin and Wilhelm Furtwängler, she began studying with Erna Honigberger, a pupil of Carl Flesch. After Honigberger's death in 1974, she continued her studies with Aida Stucki at the Winterthur Conservatory.

Career

1970s-1980s

Mutter's playing began to receive attention and she stopped attending school to devote herself full-time to music. Conductor Herbert von Karajan arranged for her to play with the Berlin Philharmonic. Only 13 years old at the time, she made her public debut on stage in 1976 at the Lucerne Festival, where she played Mozart's Violin Concerto No. 4 in D major. In 1977, she performed at the Salzburg Festival and with the English Chamber Orchestra conducted by Daniel Barenboim. Critics praised the level of maturity in Mutter's performance, with one reviewer of Die Welt writing, "“She played it ravishingly, and above all, she did not play it at all like a child prodigy. Her technique is fully mature.”
At 15, Mutter made her first recording of the Mozart Third and Fifth violin concerti with Karajan and the Berlin Philharmonic.

Mutter started to perform outside Europe in the early 1980s. In 1980, Mutter made her American debut with the New York Philharmonic playing Mendelssohn's Violin Concerto under Zubin Mehta. That same year she also made her debut with the Chicago Symphony Orchestra performing Beethoven's Romance in G major and Mozart's Third Violin Concerto under Georg Solti, and her debut with the National Symphony Orchestra playing Mozart's Third Violin Concerto under Mstislav Rostropovich. The following year Mutter made her debut at Carnegie Hall playing Mozart's Fifth Violin Concerto with the Philadelphia Orchestra under Riccardo Muti, and made her debut with the Boston Symphony Orchestra performing Bruch's Violin Concerto under Seiji Ozawa in 1983.  Mutter's Japanese debut was in Tokyo (1981) with the Berlin Philharmonic under Karajan, followed by her Russian debut in Moscow (1985).

After three years of her debut with the London Symphony Orchestra in 1980, in which she played Mendelssohn's Violin Concerto under Claudio Abbado, Mutter was named the honorary President of Oxford University's Mozart Society. 
In 1985, at the age of 22, she was made an honorary fellow of the Royal Academy of Music (London) and head of its faculty of international violin studies and in 1986 an honorary member. 

Beginning in the late 1980s, Mutter expanded her repertoire and devoted herself more to contemporary works, a focus that would become a significant component of her career. In 1986, Mutter premiered  Witold Lutosławski's Chain 2, Dialogue for Violin and Orchestra, with the Zurich Collegium Musicum. Norbert Moret composed his Violin  Concert En rêve for Mutter in 1988. 

In 1988, she also made a grand tour of Canada and the United States, performing as a soloist with orchestras and giving solo recitals with pianist Lambert Orkis. Mutter made her recital debuts in  New York (at Carnegie Hall), Washington, D.C., Los Angeles, San Francisco, Montreal, Toronto, and other cities and debuted with the San Francisco Symphony Orchestra.  Mutter premiered music by Krzysztof Penderecki and André Previn and performed classic works such as Beethoven's Violin Concerto and violin sonatas by Beethoven, Brahms, Franck, and Tartini.

1990s
By the 1990s, Mutter had established herself as an international star, transitioning from Wunderkind to mature artist The press described her as a "master of the violin" and "musician of near peerless virtuosity and unimpeachable integrity," with critics noting her glamorous image. One author of Der Spiegel wrote in regards to Mutter’s rise to fame: "In the meantime, the entire classical music world knows these tones and this musical master: Anne-Sophie Mutter, now 25, is probably the only world star made in Germany in today’s instrumentalist trade and the first violinist from [Germany] who can keep up with the world's violin standard. After Dietrich Fischer-Dieskau's flight of fancy, no other serious musician from Germany - gender notwithstanding - has succeeded in rising more quickly from the first floor to the penthouse of the international guild of interpreters. In her line of work she is at the top: Frau Fiddler on the roof."

In the 1990s, Mutter premiered Wolfgang Rihm’s Gesungene Zeit (1992), Sebastian Currier’s Aftersong (1994) and Krzysztof Penderecki's Violin Concert No. 2  Metamorphosen (1995). That same decade, Mutter released some of her best-selling albums, including Carmen Fantasie with James Levine and the Vienna Philharmonic (1993) and Vivaldi's Four Seasons with Karajan and the Vienna Philharmonic (recorded in 1984, published in 1994) and another Vivald's Four Seasons album with the Trondheim Soloists (1999). 

In 1998 she played and recorded for CD and DVD the complete set of Beethoven's Violin Sonatas (relaesed 1999), accompanied by Lambert Orkis; these were broadcast on television in many countries. Mutter devoted an entire year to performing all ten of Beethoven's violin sonatas in the "Beethoven: Face to Face" tour in cities throughout North America and Europe, including additional modern pieces. Music critic Anthony Tommasini of the New York Times wrote on a concert of the Beethoven tour, "Ms. Mutter's playing had its trademark qualities: rich yet focused tone, striking varieties of sound, articulate yet supple rhythmic play. But her increasing work in recent years with living composers has brought a new kind of intellectual energy to her playing, for she was particularly attentive to the bold turns in this youthful music."

2000s
With the turn of the century, Mutter continued supporting new music and began collaborating with composer and conductor André Previn, who dedicated several works to Mutter. Mutter premiered a Tango Song and Dance in 2002, which Previn composed for her. Mutter also gave the first permanence and recording of Previn’s Violin Concerto with the Boston Symphony Orchestra the same year, of which the recording became a critical success.  Mutter toured with orchestras under the direction of Previn, performing his concerto and later premiering Previn’s double concerto for violin and contrabass in 2007 with Roman Patkolò. Two years later, she premiered his Second Piano Trio with Lynn Harrell and Previn and Concerto for Violin and Viola with Yuri Bashmet. 

Other contemporary works dedicated to Mutter that she premiered included Henri Dutilleux’s Nocturne for violin and orchestra Sur le même accord (2002) under Kurt Masur conducting the London Philharmonic Orchestra and Sofia Gubaidulina’s violin concerto (2007) under Sir Simon Rattle with the Berlin Philharmonic. 

For Mozart's 250th Anniversary from 2005 to 2006, Mutter toured throughout Europe, North America, and Asia, including China, Japan, Korea, and Taiwan, performing Mozart's complete Violin Concertos, the Sinfonia Concertante for Violin, Viola and Orchestra and complete Piano Trios. Mutter performed with Lambert Orkis and André Previn as pianists. Five DVD and CD recordings containing the works performed on tour and the complete Violin sonatas of Mozart were released.

In October 2006, on French television, Mutter appeared to indicate that she would be retiring when she turned 45, in 2008. However the following month she said that her words were "misinterpreted" and that she would continue to play as long as she felt she could "bring anything new, anything important, anything different to music".

2010s-present

Mutter performed classical and contemporary works during the 2010s, touring Europe, North America, Asia, South America, and Australia. For her yearly tours and performances, she continued her collaborations with Lambert Orkis and performed the major concertos of the classical repertoire. She premiered Wolfgang Rihm’s “Lichtes Spiel” with the New York Philharmonic and “Dyade” with double bass player Roman Patkoló  in 2010  and Sebastian Currier’s "Time Machines" with the New York Philharmonic conducted by Alan Gilbert in 2011 to critical acclaim. 

In 2011, Mutter established the Mutter Virtuosi, composed of select students and graduates of the Anne-Sophie Mutter Foundation (established 2008) that perform with Mutter. The chamber ensemble has toured multiple times throughout different continents in the 2010s, performing modern works and classics such as Vivaldi’s Four Seasons. As part of Deutsche Grammophon’s series to introduce classical music to broader audiences, Mutter and the Mutter Virtuosi performed works by Bach, Vivaldi, Gershwin and John Williams in a night club at Berlin’s venue Neue Heimat in 2015. The performance was recorded for The Club Album - Live from the Yellow Lounge.

Mutter gave the world premiere of Previn's "Violin Concerto no. 2 for Violin and String Orchestra with the Trondheim Soloists in 2012, the premier of Sebastian Currier's "Ringtone Variations" for violin and double bass in 2013, and the premiere of John Williams’ Markings for solo violin, strings and harp with the Boston Symphony Orchestra under Andris Nelsons in 2017. In 2018, Mutter premiered Previn’s The Fifth Season, Krzysztof Penderecki’s Sonata for Violin and Piano No. 2, and his Duo concertante per violino e contrabbasso. 

In 2018, Mutter gave a concert with pianist Lang Lang titled the Berlin Concert with the Staatskapelle Berlin under Manfred Honeck for the 120 Anniversary of Deutsche Grammophon. For the anniversary, Mutter also gave concerts in Seoul, South Korea, and Tokyo, Japan. The following year, Mutter performed for the 20th anniversary of the Oxford Philharmonic Orchestra with Maxim Vengerov and Martha Argerich.

In 2019, Mutter joined John Williams to perform William’s works for solo violin and orchestra, titled “Across The Stars”. The tour and album contained works from William’s film scores, with such notable pieces as the Star Wars themes, Rey and Yoda, and Hedwig's Theme from Harry Potter. The same year, Mutter toured Europe with the West–Eastern Divan Orchestra, playing Beethoven’s Triple Concerto with Daniel Barenboim and Yo-Yo Ma. The tour included stops in Buenos Aires and Berlin, and resulted in the release of a CD by Deutsche Grammophon. In March 2019, Mutter premiered Sebastian Currier’s Ghost Trio with Daniel Müller-Schott and Lambert Orkis at Carnegie Hall.

In September 2019, Mutter stopped during a performance of Beethoven's Violin Concerto with the Cincinnati Symphony Orchestra to ask a cellphone user to stop recording. The incident received significant press coverage and refueled debates about concert cellphone etiquette. 

Mutter has recently premiered several pieces that have been dedicated to her, including Jörg Widmann’s string quartet Studie über Beethoven in Tokyo (2020), John Williams’ Concerto for Violin and Orchestra No. 2 in Tanglewood with the Boston Symphony Orchestra (2021), Unsuk Chin’s violin duet Gran Cadenza (2021) in Regensburg with violinist Ye-Eun Choi and Thomas Adès’ work for violin and orchestra Air -Homage to Sibelius (2022) at the Lucerne Festival with the Lucerne Festival Contemporary Orchestra.

Repertoire 
Mutter's works include traditional classic pieces that are part of the violin repertoire. Mutter has performed and made recordings of the major violin concertos by Bach, Bartók, Berg, Brahms, Bruch, Beethoven, Dvořák, Mendelssohn, Mozart, Sibelius, Tchaikovsky, and Vivaldi. Her repertoire includes performances and recordings of the double and triple concertos by Brahms and Beethoven, violin romances by Beethoven, Bruch, and Dvořák, and popular orchestral works by Massenet, Sarasate, and Saint Saëns, and standard solo works by Bach and Paganini. Part of her repertoire encompasses chamber works such as the complete violin sonatas by Beethoven, Brahms, and Mozart, other sonatas by Bartók, Franck, Mendelssohn, Prokofiev and Tartini, trios by Beethoven and Mozart, and string quartets by Mozart, Beethoven and Haydn, and Schubert's Trout Quintet and Fantasy in C Major.

Though her repertoire includes many classical works, Mutter is particularly known for her performances of contemporary music. Several pieces have been specially written for or dedicated to her, including Henri Dutilleux's Sur le même accord, Krzysztof Penderecki's Second Violin Concerto, Witold Lutosławski's Chain 2 and the orchestral version of Partita, and Wolfgang Rihm's Gesungene Zeit ("Time Chant"), Lichtes Spiel, and Dyade and Sofia Gubaidulina's Violin Concerto No. 2 "In tempus praesens," among others. Mutter premiered André Previn's Violin Concerto "Anne-Sophie", whose recording received a Grammy Award. Mutter's recordings of Penderecki's Violin Concerto No. 2, Metamorphosen, and Rihm's Time Chant also received Grammy Awards. 

World renowned film score composer and five times Academy Awards winner John Williams composed original music for her, including a pièce for violin, strings and harp called "Markings" (2017), a collection of arrangements of movie themes composed by him for violin and orchestra (recorded by Mutter and Williams with the Recording Arts Orchestra of Los Angeles in "Across the Stars", 2019) and Williams' second violin concerto (composed 2021, to be recorded by Mutter with the Boston Symphony Orchestra, the author as conductor, in 2022). Mutter also appeared as soloist in John Williams' debut concert with the Wiener Philharmoniker on 28 and 29 January 2020, recorded by Deutsche Grammophon and released in the live album "John Williams in Vienna", which became the best-selling album of orchestral music in 2020.

Playing style and appearance 

Anne-Sophie Mutter is known for her versatile technique, dynamic range of style, richness of tone and articulate, colorful sound. Critics have noted Mutter’s personal and thorough interpretation of the music and dedication to the musical works she plays, as she often studies the letters, original scores, and other historical documents by the composer to guide her interpretation. Mutter often divides critics: some praise the sublimity, gracefulness, dexterity, intellectual energy, and sophistication of her music, while others view her playing overly refined, idiosyncratic and caught up in minute details and maintain that Mutter over-interprets works and imposes herself on the music. 

Mutter is known for performing in strapless gowns. Mutter explained that she felt having fabric on her shoulder made it too slippery to hold her violin firmly while she was playing.

Instruments 
She owns two Stradivarius violins: the Emiliani of 1703, and the Lord Dunn-Raven Stradivarius of 1710, of which Mutter primarily performs on the latter. Mutter acquired the Emilinia from John & Arthur Beare in London in 1979 and the Lord Dunn-Raven from Bein & Fushi in Chicago in 1984. She also owns a Finnigan-Klaembt dated 1999 and a Regazzi dated 2005.

Mutter has described her Stradivarius violin as her soul mate, saying “It sounded the way I (had) always been hoping. It's the oldest part of my body and my soul. The moment I am on stage, we are one, musically." Mutter ascribes the personal fit of her stradivarius violin to the "depths of the colors and the incredible amount of dynamic range." She prefers the Lord Dunn-Raven, stating that the Emilia lacks "a dimension: It has no edginess. I miss the unbridled power. I need this roughness for the eruptive moments of the Beethoven sonatas. You need it for Brahms, Sibelius and contemporary works."

Public engagement

Throughout her career, Mutter has held many benefit concerts for various organizations such as Save the Children Japan, Save the Children Yemen, Artists against Aids, the Swiss Multiple Sclerosis Society, the Hanna and Paul Gräb Foundation’s Haus der Diakonie in Wehr-Öflingen, the Bruno Bloch Foundation, Beethoven Fund for Deaf Children, SOS Children’s Villages in Syria and others. In 2018, Mutter gave a benefit concert commemorating a liberation concert in May 1945 for Holocaust survivors by Jewish musicians at the St. Ottilien Archabbey. In 2022, the New York Philharmonic and Mutter performed Jewish music, including Previn's violin concerto at Peenemünde, a former Nazi army research center site. Since March 2022, Mutter has been giving benefit concerts for Ukrainians in light of the 2022 Russian invasion of Ukraine.

Mutter founded the Association of Friends of the Anne-Sophie Mutter Foundation e.V. in 1997 and further established the Anne-Sophie Mutter Foundation in 2008, which supports young stringed instrument players and provides scholarships for talented individuals. Mutter initiated the foundation based on her belief that "Music should grip people, move people; it should tell stories; it should have an impact." Since 2011, the ensemble group Mutter's Virtuosi performs with Mutter and includes students supported by the foundation that also commissions new works for its students. Notable former scholarship holders and Mutter's Virtuosi members include violinists Timothy Chooi, Fanny Clamagirand, Vilde Frang, Sergey Khachatryan, Arabella Steinbacher, Noa Wildschut, and Nancy Zhou and cellists Pablo Ferrández, Maximilian Hornung, Linus Roth, Daniel Müller-Schott, and Kian Soltani, among others.

During the COVID-19 pandemic, Mutter voiced her concerns about the impact of lockdowns on musicians, particularly classical musicians, and called for the German government to provide financial support. 

In 2021, Anne-Sophie Mutter was elected president of the German Cancer Aid.

Personal life 
In 1989, Mutter married her first husband, Detlef Wunderlich, with whom she had two children, Arabella and Richard. Wunderlich died of cancer in 1995. She dedicated her 1999 recording, Vivaldi: The Four Seasons, to his memory. She married the pianist, composer, and conductor André Previn in 2002. The couple divorced in 2006, but continued to collaborate musically and maintained their friendship.

Awards and recognition 

 Grammy Award for Best Chamber Music Performance:
 Anne-Sophie Mutter and Lambert Orkis for Beethoven: The Violin Sonatas (Nos. 1–3, Op. 12; Nos. 1–3, Op. 30; "Spring" Sonata) (2000)
 Grammy Award for Best Instrumental Soloist(s) Performance (with orchestra):
 Anne-Sophie Mutter and André Previn (conductor) for Previn: Violin Concerto "Anne-Sophie"/Bernstein: Serenade (2005)
 Anne-Sophie Mutter, Krzysztof Penderecki (conductor) and the London Symphony Orchestra for Penderecki: Violin Concerto No. 2, Metamorphosen  (1999)
 Anne-Sophie Mutter, James Levine (conductor) and the Chicago Symphony Orchestra for Berg: Violin Concerto/Rihm: Time Chant (1994)
 Naming of Anne-Sophie-Mutter-Weg in Wehr, Baden-Württemberg (Eng: Anne-Sophie Mutter way) (27 August 1988)
 Order of Merit of Baden-Württemberg (1999)
 Austrian Cross of Honour for Science and Art (1999)
 Sonning Award (2001; Denmark)
 Bavarian Maximilian Order for Science and Art (2002)
 Herbert von Karajan Music Prize (Baden-Baden, 2003)
 Knight of the Ordre des Arts et des Lettres (2005)
 Victoires de la Musique Classique (2006)
 Grand Decoration of Honour for Services to the Republic of Austria (2007)
 Ernst von Siemens Music Prize (2008)
 Mendelssohn Prize (Music category) (Leipzig, 2008)
 Merit Cross 1st Class of the Federal Republic of Germany (Verdienstkreuz 1. Klasse) (2009)
 Chevalier de la Legion d'honneur (France, 2009) for her commitment to the works of contemporary music by French
 Echo Klassik as Instrumentalist (2009)
 European St. Ulrichs Prize (July 2009) 
 Doctor Honoris Causa from the Norwegian University of Science and Technology (NTNU) (2010)
 Prize of the Cultural Foundation of Dortmund
 Brahms Prize (Brahms Society of Schleswig-Holstein, 2011) 
 Atlantic Council Distinguished Artistic Leadership Award (2012)
 Bavarian Order of Merit
 Cultural Honour of the City of Munich
 Honorary Member of the Royal Academy of Music
 Erich Fromm Prize for her comprehensive social work (2011)
 Gustav Adolf Prize of Gustav-Adolf-Werk of the Evangelical Church in Hesse-Nassau for her socially diaconal commitment
 The Medal of the Lutosławski Centennial (25 January 2013)
 Named a Foreign Honorary Member of the American Academy of Arts and Sciences (April 2013)
 Echo Klassik 2014 for the album 'Dvořák'
 Named an Honorary Fellow of Keble College, Oxford
 11th Yehudi Menuhin Prize from the Foundation Albeniz (2016)
 Medalla de Oro al Merito en las bellas Artes (2016)
 Romanian Cultural Order of Merit with the rank of Grand Officer (2017)
 Gold Medal for Merit to Culture – Gloria Artis (2018)
 Polar Music Prize (2019)
 Berliner Bär (BZ-Cultural Prize) (2019)
 Praemium Imperiale (2019)
Cultural Award of Baden-Württemberg (2020)
Opus Klassik, Category Instrumentalist (Violin) for Across the Stars (2020)
Honorary Degree Of Doctor Honoris Causa from the Krzysztof Penderecki Academy of Music in Kraków (2022)

Discography

Deutsche Grammophon:
 Mozart Violin Concertos Nos. 3 & 5 (1978)
 Beethoven Triple Concerto (1980)
 Beethoven Violin Concerto (1980)
 Mendelssohn Violin Concerto / Bruch Violin Concerto No. 1 (1981)
 Brahms Violin Concerto(1982)
 Brahms Double Concerto (1983)
 Tchaikovsky Violin Concerto (1988)
 Lutosławski Partita & Chain 2 / Stravinsky Violin Concerto (1988)
 Beethoven: The String Trios (1989)
 Bartok Violin Concerto No. 2 / Moret En Rêve (1991)
 Berg Violin Concerto / Rihm Time Chant (1992)
 Carmen-Fantasy (1993)
 Romance (1995)
 Sibelius Violin Concerto (1995)
 The Berlin Recital (1996)
 Brahms Violin Concerto / Schumann Fantasy for Violin and Orchestra (1997)
 Penderecki Violin Concerto No. 2 / Bartok Sonata for Violin and Piano No. 2 (1997)
 Beethoven The Violin Sonatas (1998)
 Vivaldi The Four Seasons (1999)
 Recital 2000 (2000)
 Lutosławski Partita for Violin and Orchestra / Chain 2 (2002)
 Beethoven Violin Concerto (2002)
 Tango Song and Dance (2003)
 Previn Violin Concerto / Bernstein Serenade (2003)
 Tchaikovsky & Korngold Violin Concertos (2004)
 Dutilleux Sur le même accord / Bartok Violin Concerto No. 2 / Stravinsky Concerto en ré (2005)
 Mozart The Violin Concertos (2005)
 Mozart Piano Trios K502, K542, K548 (2006)
 Mozart The Violin Sonatas (August 2006)
 Simply Anne-Sophie (2006)
 Gubaidulina in tempus praesens (2008)
 Mendelssohn Violin Concerto (2009)
 Brahms Violin Sonatas (2010)
 Rihm: Lichtes Spiel; Currier: Time Machines (2011)
 The Complete Musician: Highlights (2011)
 Asm 35: The Complete Musician (2011)
 Dvořák: Violin Concerto (2013)
 The Silver Album (2014)
 Anne-Sophie Mutter Live: The Club Album from Yellow Lounge (2015)
 Mutterissimo: The Art of Anne-Sophie Mutter (2016)
 Franz Schubert: Trout Quintett(with Daniil Trifonov, Maximilian Hornung,      Hwayoon Lee, und Roman Patkaló)(2017)
 Hommage à Penderecki (2018)
 The Early Years (2018) 
 The Tokyo Gala Concert (2019)
 “Hedwig’s Theme” from Harry Potter (2019)
 Across the Stars (2019) (Works of John Williams; Direction: John Williams)
 "Remembrances" & "Markings" (2019)
 Beethoven Triple Concerto & Symphony 7 (with Barenboim and Yo-Yo Ma) (2020)
 John Williams in Vienna (2020) 
 Williams, Violin Concerto No. 2 & Selected Film Themes (2022)

Sony Classical Records:
Brahms Double Concerto & Clara Schumann Piano Trio (2022)

EMI Classics: 
 Mozart Violin Concertos Nos. 2 & 4 (1982)
 Bach Violin Concertos / Concerto for Two Violins and Orchestra (1983)
 Brahms Violin Sonatas (1983)
 Vivaldi The Four Seasons (1984)
 Lalo: Symphonie Espagnole / Sarasate: Zigeunerweisen (1985)
 Mozart Violin Concerto No. 1, Sinfonia Concertante (1991)
 Meditation: Vivaldi, Mozart, Massenet, Sarasate (1995)

References

External links

Living people
People from Rheinfelden (Baden)
Academics of the Royal Academy of Music
German classical violinists
Grammy Award winners
Honorary Members of the Royal Academy of Music
Fellows of the American Academy of Arts and Sciences
Commanders Crosses of the Order of Merit of the Federal Republic of Germany
Recipients of the Order of Merit of Baden-Württemberg
Recipients of the Austrian Cross of Honour for Science and Art
Chevaliers of the Ordre des Arts et des Lettres
Recipients of the Grand Decoration for Services to the Republic of Austria
Recipients of the National Order of Merit (Romania)
Recipients of the Gold Medal for Merit to Culture – Gloria Artis
Recipients of the Praemium Imperiale
Recipients of the Legion of Honour
Mendelssohn Prize winners
Deutsche Grammophon artists
EMI Classics and Virgin Classics artists
Chevaliers of the Légion d'honneur
Zurich University of the Arts alumni
Recipients of the Léonie Sonning Music Prize
Child classical musicians
Women classical violinists
Herbert von Karajan Music Prize winners
Ernst von Siemens Music Prize winners
21st-century classical violinists
20th-century classical violinists
21st-century women musicians
German women musicians
Previn family
Erato Records artists
1963 births
People from Baden-Württemberg